Ames Airport may refer to:

 Ames Municipal Airport in Ames, Iowa, US (FAA/IATA: AMW)
 Ames Field in Trenton, Florida, US (FAA: 8J2)